Marriage and Other Disasters (also known as Weddings and Other Disasters) is a 2010 Italian comedy film written and directed  by Nina Di Majo.

It  was nominated for two Silver Ribbons, for best actress (Margherita Buy) and best supporting actress (Luciana Littizzetto).

Cast 

Margherita Buy as Nanà
Fabio Volo as  Alessandro
Francesca Inaudi as  Bea
Luciana Littizzetto as  Benedetta
Marisa Berenson as  Lucrezia 
Mohammad Bakri as Bauer
Massimo De Francovich as Neri

See also    
 List of Italian films of 2010

References

External links 

2010 comedy films
2010 films
Italian comedy films
Films about weddings
2010s Italian films